The Walloon Union of Companies or Union Wallonne des Entreprises (UWE) is the Walloon employers organization.

History
About 1965, when economic decentralization was becoming more pronounced in Belgium, Walloon business leaders felt the need for more organisation. The pioneers of the UWE, were, to name a few, Jules Delruelle (Prayon), George Halbart (Magotteaux), George Henry (Glaverbel), Pierre Holoffe (Asphaltco), Leon Jacques (Carrières de Quenast) Jean Lannoye (Papeteries de Genval), Jules Plaquet (Compagnie des Ciments Belges), Alfred Putzeys (Pieux Franki).

Together they decided, at the end of 1967, to invite a hundred company managers to a meeting, the result of which was to create the Walloon Union of Companies (rather than the Union of Walloon Companies), in this way allowing the many foreign companies  established in the Walloon Area to join the organization. It is also decided to open the organization to both the industrial and non-industrial sectors. The FEB (Federation of the Companies of Belgium) had not been established at that point and the national organization was based on a Federation of the Industrialists of Belgium and a Federation of the non-industrial companies of Belgium.

Following this first meeting, it was decided to set up a Board of Directors and gather some initial funding. The new organization was founded on 2 April 1968. The first general meeting, in 1969, took place at the Charleroi Institute of Glass.

Sources
 Union Wallonne des Entreprises

See also
 Brussels Enterprises Commerce and Industry
 VOKA
 Economy of Belgium
 Science and technology in Wallonia
 Agoria
 UNIZO
 Cercle de Lorraine
 Prince Albert Fund

Trade associations based in Belgium
Labor relations
Economy of Belgium
Employers' organizations
1968 establishments in Belgium
Organizations established in 1968
Wallonia